The 2018 Rally America season was the 14th season of the Rally America series. The championship series began in November 2017 with the Nemadji Trail rally and concluded in October 2018 with the Lake Superior Performance Rally. Rally Wyoming was cancelled twice due to lack of participation.

Rally Driver Overall National Championship Standings

References

External links
Official website

Rally America seasons
America
Rally America